France sent a delegation to compete at the 1964 Summer Paralympics in Tokyo, Japan.  The French athletes finished eleventh in the overall medal count.

Medalists

See also 
 France at the Paralympics
 France at the 1964 Summer Olympics

References 

Nations at the 1964 Summer Paralympics
1964
Summer Paralympics